Bhagwanpura may refer to:

 Bhagwanpura, Haryana, in India
 Bhagwanpura (Ludhiana East)
 Bhagwanpura, Madhya Pradesh, in India
 Bhagwanpura (Vidhan Sabha constituency), Madhya Pradesh

See also 
 Bhagwanpur (disambiguation)